Pembina Valley Provincial Park is a provincial park in southern Manitoba, Canada. The park is considered to be a Class III protected area under the IUCN protected area management categories.

The park was officially opened on October 5, 2001 by Premier Gary Doer and James Richardson, representing the Nature Conservancy of Canada.  Pembina Valley Provincial Park is Manitoba's 75th provincial park.  The park contains approximately 12.7 km of hiking trails.  In 2009, a 24 m (80 ft) single-span steel bridge and 9 m (30 ft) observation tower were added to the park.

A Rocha Canada operates a Field Study Centre on 100 acres immediately adjacent to the park, and assists parks staff in conducting interpretive walks. A Rocha offers environmental, place-based learning programs for children, youth, and educators. They also operated a B&B, which earned the Pembina Valley Tourism's 2010 Award of Distinction, for travellers visiting the park that may wish to stay nearby.

The park is located at the extreme southwest corner of the Rural Municipality of Stanley, and the extreme southeast corner of the Rural Municipality of Pembina.

See also
List of protected areas of Manitoba
Pembina Gorge State Recreation Area, North Dakota

References

External links

Find Your Favorite Park: Pembina Valley Provincial Park
Plant Species of Pembina Valley Provincial Park

Provincial parks of Manitoba
Protected areas established in 2001
2001 establishments in Manitoba
Protected areas of Manitoba